En Tus Manos may refer to:

 En Tus Manos (film), a 2010 short film 
 En Tus Manos (album), a 1997 album by La Mafia